Conexión (plural: conexiones) or variants may refer to:

Conexión (band), Spanish band active 1969-1974
Conexión (María José album), 2019
Conexión, album by Conexión (band) 1971
Conexión, album by Todo Mundo (band)  2013
Conexión, live album by Ana Torroja 2015
Conexión, album by Fonseca (singer) 2015
Conexión, album by Chicuelo (guitarist) and pianist Marco Mezquida 2017
La Conexión, 1996 album by German salsa band Conexión Latina
La Conexión, 2013 album by Black Guayaba, nominated for a Latin Grammy in the Best Pop/Rock Album category
La Conexión, 2005 mixtape by girl group Nina Sky

See also 
 Connexion (disambiguation)